The  New York Giants season was the franchise's 22nd season in the National Football League.

Schedule

Playoffs

Standings

See also
List of New York Giants seasons

New York Giants seasons
New York Giants season
New York Giants season
1940s in Manhattan
Washington Heights, Manhattan